Pancheshwar Nath Mahadev Mandir ( Also Baba Pancheshwar Nath Mahadev Mandir) is a Hindu temple of Shiva in Madhwapur block of Madhubani district in Mithila region of Bihar. An annual four day Ganesh Puja festival is organised by Ganesh Puja Samiti at the temple. An annual Durga Puja festival has been held since 1954, and is organised by Durga Puja Samiti. In the Hindu month of Sawan month of the Hindu calendar local residents do Jalabhishek on the Shivling of the temple every Monday.

References 

Hindu temple architecture
Hindu temples
Shiva temples
Shaivism
Mithila